Diaphus malayanus, the Malayan lanternfish, is a species of lanternfish found in the Western Pacific Ocean.

Size

Etymology
The fish is named  because it was found in the Malay Archipelago.

References

Myctophidae
Taxa named by Max Carl Wilhelm Weber
Fish described in 1913